Carole Richert (born 28 September 1967) is a French actress. She studied at the National Conservatory of Dramatic Arts in Paris. She played Marie-France in the series  Clem, broadcast on TF1.

Personal life 
Richert married her husband Daniel Rialet on 18 June 2003, with whom she has two children: Pauline, born in 1996 and Vincent, born in 2000. Rialet died of a heart attack on April 11, 2006 at the age of forty-six.

Filmography

Films

Television

References

External links

1967 births
Living people
20th-century French actresses
21st-century French actresses
French film actresses
French stage actresses
French television actresses
Actors from Strasbourg